The NCAA women's gymnastics championships are an annual gymnastics competition to determine the best collegiate women's gymnastics team in the country. Unlike most NCAA sports, the women's gymnastics championship is not separated into divisions and uses a single National Collegiate championship instead.

History 
The NCAA introduced women's gymnastics as a championship sport in 1982.  Gymnastics was one of twelve women's sports added to the NCAA championship program for the 1981–82 school year, as the NCAA engaged in battle with the Association for Intercollegiate Athletics for Women for sole governance of women's collegiate sports. The AIAW continued to conduct its established championship program in the same twelve (and other) sports; however, after a year of dual women's championships, the NCAA conquered the AIAW and usurped its authority and membership.

Under the NCAA, only seven universities have claimed the overall Division I (pre-1987) or National Collegiate (1987–present) championship; the Division II competition was discontinued in 1987. During the early years of competition, the University of Utah, under the leadership of head coach Greg Marsden, dominated the field of competition. During the late 1980s and 1990s, the University of Georgia (UGA), coached by Suzanne Yoculan, and the University of Alabama, coached by Sarah Patterson, gained success and claimed several titles.  From 1996 to 2012, the University of Alabama, the University of Georgia, and UCLA, coached by Valorie Kondos Field, claimed all NCAA titles; four titles for the University of Alabama, seven for UCLA and seven for the University of Georgia.

In 2013, the University of Florida, coached by Rhonda Faehn, broke the reign of the prior four teams, winning the NCAA Championships held at UCLA's newly renovated Pauley Pavilion in Los Angeles, California. Faehn was a competitor for the Bruins 1990–1992. The University of Oklahoma, coached by K. J. Kindler, became the sixth team to win the NCAA title after tying with Florida in 2014. In 2021, the University of Michigan, coached by Bev Plocki, became the seventh team to win the NCAA title.

Team titles

Team champions

Individual champions

Gymnasts who have won individual titles on 4 or more events

Total individual champions by school

Gym Slam 
A Gym Slam (sometimes spelled as GymSlam) is the accomplishment of scoring a perfect 10.0 on each apparatus.  Only 13 women in NCAA gymnastics have achieved this feat, 3 have achieved it twice, and Trinity Thomas is the only gymnast to have achieved this feat 4 times.

See also
NCAA Men's Gymnastics championship
AIAW Intercollegiate Women's Gymnastics champions
NAIA Women's Gymnastics Championships
East Atlantic Gymnastics League
List of gymnastics terms

References

External links
NCAA women's gymnastics homepage
 Women's Gymnastics Championship Records Through 2014
 Division II Women's Gymnastics Championship Records 1982–86